Mansergh is a surname. Notable people with the surname include:
Aubrey Mansergh (1898–1990), Royal Navy officer
James Mansergh (1834–1905), English civil engineer
Martin Mansergh (b. 1946), Irish politician and historian
Maurice Mansergh (1896–1966), Royal Navy officer
Nicholas Mansergh (1910–91), historian of Ireland and the British Commonwealth
Richard St George Mansergh-St George (b. 1757), British Army officer and Irish magistrate
Robert Mansergh (1900–70), British Army officer